WLCN-CD, virtual and UHF digital channel 18, is a low-power, Class A Christian Television Network (CTN) owned-and-operated station licensed to Charleston, South Carolina, United States. The station's transmitter is located in Summerville, South Carolina. WLCN-CD offers 24-hour religious programming, much of which is produced either locally or at the CTN home base in Clearwater, Florida.

History

WLCN-CD began broadcasting on June 12, 2009 under the ownership of Jen Rose Broadcasting. The station offered local news, weather, and sports programming along with syndicated programming from America One and My Family TV. After its conversion to digital, the station added Retro TV and Untamed Sports to its subchannels. WLCN produced local shows with emphasis on political, financial and spiritual support, as well as local sports such as South Carolina Stingrays ice hockey and Summerville High School Greenwave football.

On January 23, 2011, the station's previous owners, Faith Assembly of God of Summerville, sold the station to the Christian Television Network. The sale closed on January 23, 2012. Soon afterward, programming on WLCN switched to programming and services similar to other CTN stations.

Subchannels

The station's digital signal is multiplexed:

References

External links
 CTN / WLCN Homepage
 Jen Rose Broadcasting (former owners of WLCN, as WJRB)

LCN-CD
Low-power television stations in the United States
Television channels and stations established in 1997
1997 establishments in South Carolina
Christian Television Network affiliates